Leliefontein may refer to:

Leliefontein, Northern Cape
Battle of Leliefontein, which took place south of Belfast, Mpumalanga, South Africa
Leliefontein massacre, in the Northern Cape, South Africa